Jack Beebe was a boat builder and designer from Marine City, Michigan who drove the Miss Detroit hydroplane to the 1915 American Power Boat Association Gold Cup victory after replacing the original driver of the boat who became seasick.
Beebe's boats were known for their speed.

References

Further reading
 Nutting, Wm. Washburn (August 25, 1917). "The Regatta on the St. Lawrence: Hawk Eye II". Motorboat. Volume XIV, Number 16. p. 8

American boat builders
American designers
American motorboat racers
Year of birth missing
Year of death missing